Lin Shan (born 3 August 2001) is a Chinese diver.

She participated at the 2019 World Aquatics Championships, winning a medal.

References

External links

 
 
 

2001 births
Living people
Chinese female divers
World Aquatics Championships medalists in diving
Divers at the 2018 Summer Youth Olympics
Medalists at the 2018 Summer Youth Olympics
Youth Olympic gold medalists for China
21st-century Chinese women